Witton is a village and civil parish in the English county of Norfolk.

The villages name means 'wood farm/settlement'.

For the purposes of local government, the parish falls within the district of North Norfolk.

The parish church has a round tower, making it one of the many round-towered churches in Norfolk and Suffolk.

References

External links
.
Information from Genuki Norfolk on Witton.
St Margaret's on the European Round Tower Churches website

Villages in Norfolk
Civil parishes in Norfolk
North Norfolk